Parsons Boulevard is a road in Queens, New York. Its northern end is at Malba Drive in the Malba  neighborhood and its southern end is at Archer Avenue in downtown Jamaica.

Route
The road stretches for nearly six miles, divided into four segments:

 Malba Drive to Whitestone Expressway: 
 Whitestone Expressway to Rose Avenue at Kissena Park: 
 Booth Memorial Avenue to Horace Harding Expressway: 
 Horace Harding Expressway to Archer Avenue:

History

Parsons Boulevard takes its name from Samuel Bowne Parsons Sr., who moved to Flushing from Manhattan around 1800 and married Mary Bowne, a descendant of prominent local settler John Bowne. Samuel Bowne Parsons Sr. was an accomplished and well noted horticulturist, who was the first to import Japanese Maples and propagate rhododendrons. Parsons' nursery was located within present-day Kissena Park.

The oldest section of Parsons Boulevard is between Kissena Boulevard in Kew Gardens Hills and Archer Avenue in Jamaica. Dating to the colonial period, this segment, together with Kissena Boulevard, connected the early settlements of Jamaica and Flushing. The most recent section of Parsons Boulevard was completed in 1951, during the construction of the Pomonok apartments. In contrast to most boulevards in Queens, Parsons is not regarded as a major transportation route because it is broken into four segments, with the section through Kissena Park having never been built, along with the Whitestone Expressway and Long Island Expressway interrupting its route.

Transportation
Between 14th Avenue and Union Street, the Q20 and Q44 buses follow Parsons Boulevard. Between Kissena Boulevard and Archer Avenue, the Q25 and Q34 buses follow Parsons Boulevard.

Parsons Boulevard is also the name of the following stations of the New York City Subway in Queens:

Parsons Boulevard (IND Queens Boulevard Line), serving the 
Jamaica Center–Parsons/Archer (New York City Subway), serving the

References

Streets in Queens, New York
Flushing, Queens
Jamaica, Queens